Becky Priest is an American country music singer-songwriter and instrumentalist hailing from Hubbard, Texas and now based in Nashville, Tennessee.

Since moving to Nashville in 1992, Priest has toured over 26 countries as both primary artist and with many artists including Neal McCoy, Trisha Yearwood, Patty Loveless, Pam Tillis, Mel Tillis, Mel Tillis, Jr., Carrie April Tillis, Vince Gill, Alabama, Garth Brooks, Michael McDonald, Christopher Cross, Liza Minnelli, Engelbert Humperdinck, Huey Lewis and the News, Jim Peterik & The Ides of March, Lou Gramm of Foreigner, Foghat, 38 Special, Lynyrd Skynyrd, Chuck Negron of Three Dog Night and Whose Line Is It Anyway comedian/entertainer, Wayne Brady.

Musical biography

Current engagement
Becky Priest will start 2009 as Bandleader, (considered groundbreaking for women musicians in Country Music), and Keyboardist/Background Vocalist for Neal McCoy, former Entertainer of the Year Award Winner, and Academy of Country Music's Humanitarian Award recipient.

Prior engagements

Cowboy Crush
Priest was a founding member of the all-female band Cowboy Crush, originally signed in 2003 to Curb/Asylum Records in Nashville, Tennessee. While a member of Cowboy Crush Priest performed all high harmonies, and the majority of the piano, Hammond B3 and synthesizer tracks on Cowboy Crush's eleven Curb/Asylum recordings. During the five years Cowboy Crush was signed to Curb/Asylum and touring, Becky also held the positions of bandleader, main harmony vocalist, keyboardist and acoustic guitarist.

Priest's vocal arranging skills are attributed to earning Cowboy Crush their nationally televised appearance on the NASCAR Budweiser Shootout to perform her arrangement of "The Star-Spangled Banner", live in Daytona, Florida in February 2007. Event attendance numbered approximately 100,000 with television viewership estimated at over 8 million.

As a member of Cowboy Crush, Priest gave numerous performances overseas for members of the U.S. military. Cowboy Crush's recording of "He's Coming Home" was received highly by the United States Army which chose to fund, cast and film the accompanying video. The video was released internationally and Priest has stated publicly that it was "...one of her proudest moments to have participated in a recording and video that helped raise the morale of our wonderful Men and Women of our Armed Forces".

Additionally, Priest with Cowboy Crush opened shows for some of the best known names in country music, including Charlie Daniels, Trace Adkins, Reba McEntire, Rascal Flatts, Big & Rich, Dierks Bentley and others.

Trisha Yearwood
Prior to co-founding Cowboy Crush Priest worked with numerous well known Country Artists. Eight months after arriving in Nashville her initial engagement was with multiple Grammy award winner, Trisha Yearwood. This engagement was to last three years and led to numerous nationally televised appearances including, Late Night with David Letterman, The Tonight Show with Jay Leno. Priest also graced stages of top level productions of not only the Ryman Auditorium, the Grand Ole Opry, Music City Tonight, The Crook & Chase Show, Good Morning America, The Today Show, but also New York City's Radio City Music Hall and London's Albert Hall. Along with these appearances Becky performed for a number of Symphony shows with Yearwood, including an exclusive special shot in Daytona, Florida with the London Philharmonic. One of the special highlights of her period of performing with Yearwood, occurred June 23, 1994, when she and Yearwood's band entertained President Clinton and First Lady, Hillary Clinton, for a Command Performance at The White House.

Pam Tillis
Following her years with Trisha Yearwood, Priest performed nationally with Grammy Award winning, Pam Tillis in the United States and toured in Australia. Television performances with Tillis included Grand Ole Opry Live, The Tonight Show with Jay Leno and additional Symphony dates.

Recently, Priest rejoined with Pam Tillis for a six-week engagement with Pam Tillis, sister Carrie April Tillis, brother Mel Tillis, Jr. and legendary Country Music Hall of Fame Member, Mel Tillis. Priest will also perform with The Tillis Clan in their first Tillis Family Christmas Tour, year end 2008.

Video appearances
Priest has appeared in several videos including Patty Loveless' video, Lovin' All Night, and Neal McCoy's video, Billy's Got His Beer Goggles On, with actor Rob Schneider and famous 'animal guy', Jack Hanna. Becky also appeared in her first video as a 'signed Artist' in the summer of 2005, when Cowboy Crush premiered their video, Nobody Ever Died of a Broken Heart. It made it to the number 17 spot on GAC's Top Twenty Countdown.

Discography

Albums

Music videos

Television appearances
Late Night with David Letterman
The Tonight Show with Jay Leno
Late Night with Conan O'Brien
Good Morning America
The Today Show
Regis and Kathy Lee
Ali and Jack
CMT's Most Wanted Live
Austin City Limits
Prime Time Country
Music City Tonight
Countryfest
2007 NASCAR's Budweiser Shootout in Daytona
numerous CMA Award Shows
The Grand Ole Opry

References

External links

Living people
Year of birth missing (living people)
American women country singers
American country singer-songwriters
People from Hubbard, Texas
Country musicians from Texas
21st-century American women
Singer-songwriters from Texas